Abroscelis was a genus of beetles in the family Cicindelidae, containing the following species:

 Abroscelis anchoralis Chevrolat, 1845
 Abroscelis longipes (Fabricius, 1798)
 Abroscelis maino MacLeay, 1876
 Abroscelis mucronata Jordan, 1894
 Abroscelis psammodroma Chevrolat, 1845
 Abroscelis tenuipes (Dejean, 1826)

References

Cicindelidae